The Makasar script, also known as Ukiri' Jangang-jangang (bird's script) or Old Makasar script, is a historical Indonesian Writing system that was used in South Sulawesi to write the Makassarese language between the 17th and 19th centuries until it was supplanted by the Lontara Bugis script.

The Makasar script is an abugida which consists of 18 basic characters. Like other Brahmic scripts, each letter represents a syllable with an inherent vowel /a/, which can be changed with diacritics. The direction of writing is left to right. This script is written without wordspacing (scriptio continua) and with little to no punctuation. "Coda syllables", or consonants at the end of syllables, are not written in the Makasar script, so a Makasar text can contain a lot of ambiguity which can only be distinguished from context.

History 
Scholars generally believe that the Makasar script was used before South Sulawesi received significant Islamic influence around the 16th century AD, based on the fact that Makasar script uses the abugida system based on the Brahmi script rather than the Arabic script which became commonplace in South Sulawesi later on. This script has its roots in the Brahmi script from southern India, possibly brought to Sulawesi through the Kawi script or another script derived from Kawi. The visual similarity of the South Sumatran characters such as the Rejang script and the Makasar script has led some experts to suggest a relationship between the two scripts. A similar theory is also elaborated by Christopher Miller who argues that the scripts of South Sumatra, South Sulawesi, and the Philippines descend from the Gujarati script, which originates in India.

However, in Stephen C Druce's opinion, it remains debatable as to whether the Makasar script was in use before the 17th century AD. This script is full of curls, curves, bridges and much more suited to being written with ink on paper rather than inscribed on palm-leaf. The Makasar script may thus have been a later innovation, which was developed from the Lontara Bugis script after paper had become available in the early 17th century AD.

There are at least four documented writing systems that have been used in South Sulawesi, which are, chronologically, Makasar script, Lontara script, Arabic script, and Latin script. In the development of manuscripts, these four writing systems are often used together depending on the context of the writing, so it is common to find a manuscript that uses more than one script, including the Makasar script which is often found mixed with the Malay-Arabic alphabet. The Makasar script was originally thought to be the ancestor of the Lontara script, but both are now considered separate branches of an ancient prototype that is assumed to be extinct. Some writers sometimes mention Daeng Pamatte', the 'syahbandar' of the Sultanate of Gowa in the early 16th century AD, as the creator of the Makasar script based on a quote in the Gowa Chronicle (Makassarese: Lontara Patturioloanga ri Tu Gowaya) which reads Daeng Pamatte' ampareki lontara' Mangkasaraka, translated as "Daeng Pamatte' which created the Makassarese Lontara" in the translation of GJ Wolhoff and Abdurrahim published in 1959. However, this opinion is rejected by most historians and linguists today, who argue that the term ampareki in this context is more accurately translated as "composing" in the sense of compiling a library or completing historical records and writing system instead of script creation from nil. The oldest surviving example of the Makasar script is the signature of the delegates from the Sultanete of Gowa in the Treaty of Bongaya from 1667, which is now stored in the National Archives of Indonesia. Meanwhile, one of the earliest manuscripts in the Makasar script of significant length that has survived, is the Gowa-Tallo chronicle from the mid 18th century AD which is kept at the Koninklijk Instituut voor de Tropen (KIT), Amsterdam (collection no. KIT 668/216).

Eventually, the Makasar script was gradually replaced with the Lontara Bugis script, which Makassarese writers sometimes referred to as "New Lontara". This change was likely influenced by the decline in the prestige of the Sultanete of Gowa, along with the increasing strength of the Buginese tribe. As the influence of Gowa decreased, the Makassar scribes no longer used Makasar script in official historical records or everyday documents, although it was still sometimes used in certain contexts as an attempt to distinguish Makassar's cultural identity from Buginese influence. The most recent manuscript with Makasar script so far known is the diary of a Gowa tumailalang (prime minister) from the 19th century whose script form has received significant influence from the Lontara Bugis script. By the end of the 19th century, the use of the Makasar script had been completely replaced by the Lontara Bugis script and nowadays there are no more native readers of the Makasar script.

Usage 

Like the Lontara script which was used in the South Sulawesi cultural sphere, the Makasar script is used in a number of related text traditions, most of which are written in manuscripts. The term lontara (sometimes spelled lontaraq or lontara to denote the glotal stop at the end) also refers to a literary genre that deals with history and genealogies, the most widely written and important writing topics by the Buginese and Makassar people. This genre can be divided into several sub-types: genealogy (lontara' pangngoriseng), daily registers (lontara' bilang), and historical or chronicle records (patturioloang). Each kingdom of South Sulawesi generally had their own official historiography in some compositional structure that utilized these three forms.  Compared to "historical" records from other parts of the archipelago, historical records in the literary tradition of South Sulawesi are considered to be decidedly more "realistic"; historical events are explained in a straightforward and plausible manner, and the relatively few fantastic elements are accompanied by markers such as the word "supposedly" so that the overall record feels factual and realistic. Even so, historical records such as the Makassar's patturiolong are inseparable from their political function as a means of ratifying power, descent, and territorial claims of certain rulers. One of these patturiolongs that was written in the Makasar script and have been researched by experts is the Chronicle of Gowa which describes the history of the kings of Gowa from the founding of the Kingdom of Gowa to the reign of Sultan Hasanuddin in the 17th century AD.

The use of diaries is one of the unique south Sulawesi phenomena with no known analogy in other Malay writing traditions. TDaily registers are often made by high ranking member of societies, such as the sultans, the rulers (arung), or the prime ministers (tumailalang). The bulk of daily register consists of ruled tables with rows of dates, in which the register owner would log important events in the allocated space of each date. Not all lines are filled if the corresponding dates did not have anything considered worthwhile to note, but only one line is reserved for each date. For a particularly eventful date, the continuing line would be written sideways to the page, following a zig-zag pattern until all space are filled.

Ambiguity 
Makasar script does not have a virama or other ways to write dead syllables even though the Makassarese language has many words with coda syllables. For example, the final nasal sound /-ŋ/ and glottal /ʔ/ which are common in Makassar language are not written in the Makasar script spelling at all, so words like ama (chicken lice), ama (like), and amang (safe) will all be written as ama  in the Makassar script. The word baba  in the Makasar script can refer to six possible words: baba, baba', ba'ba, ba'ba', bamba, and bambang. Given that Makasar script is also traditionally written without word breaks, a typical text often have a lot of ambiguous portion which can often only be distinguished through context. Readers of Makasar texts need an adequate prior understanding of the language and contents of the text in question in order to read them fluently. This ambiguity is analogous to the use of Arabic letters without vowel markers; readers whose native language uses Arabic characters intuitively understand which vowels are appropriate to use in the context of the sentence concerned, so that vowel markers are not needed in standard everyday texts. 

Even so, sometimes even context isn't sufficient to reveal how to read a sentence whose reference is unknown to the reader. As an illustration, Cummings and Jukes provide the following example to illustrate how the Makasar script can produce different meanings depending on how the reader cuts and fills in the ambiguous part: 

Without knowing the intent or event to which the author may be referring, it can be impossible for a general reader to determine the "correct" reading of the above sentence. Even the most proficient readers often needs to pause to re-interpret what they have read as new context are found in later portion of the same text.

 Form 
 Basic letters 
Basic letters ( anrong lontara’) in Makasar script represent a syllable with inherent /a/. There are 18 basic letters, shown below:

Note that the Makassar script has never undergone a standardization process like the Buginese Lontara script later on, so there are many variations of writing that can be found in Makassar manuscripts.  The form in the table above is adapted from the characters used in the diary of Pangeran Gowa, Tropenmuseum collection, numbered KIT 668-216.

 Diacritic 
Diacritics ( ana’ lontara’) are markings on the basic letters to change its vowel. There are 4 diacritics, shown below:

 Punctuation 
Historical Makassarese texts are written without wordspacing (scriptio continua) and do not use punctuation. The Makasar script is known to have only two original punctuation marks:  passimbang and a section ending mark. Passimbang functions like a period or comma in the Latin script by dividing the text into chunks that are similar (but not the same) to stanzas or sentences, while section ending marks are used to split the text into chapter-like units.

In certain manuscripts, the ending mark of a section is replaced by a punctuation that resembles a palm tree (🌴), and for the end of larger sections it is common to use the stylization of the word tammat which uses Arabic letters ).

 Repeated consonants 
Continuous syllables with the same initial consonant are often written in abbreviated form using double diacritics or a repeater letter angka which can then be reattached with a diacritic. Its use can be seen as follows:

 Example texts 
The following is an excerpt from the Chronicle of Gowa which tells the course of a battle between the Gowa and the Kingdom of Tallo which culminated in their alliance during the reign of Karaeng Gowa Tumapa'risi 'Kallonna and Karaeng Tallo Tunipasuru'.
{|
|
|-
|ia–tommi anne. ma'gau'. na nilipungi. nibundu'. ri tu Talloka. ri tu Marusuka. ri tu Polombangkenga.
|-
|On the reign [of Tumapa'risi' Kallonna] he too was surrounded and attacked by the Tallo, the Maros, [and] the Polombangkeng people.
|-
|
|-
|Karaenga. ri Tallo'. naagaanga. siewa. Tunipasuru'.
|-
|The Karaeng Tallo that fought him was Tunipasuru.
|-
|
|-
|areng kalenna. iang kumabassung. nikana. I Mangayoaberang.
|-
|His given name, may i not be damned [for insolently calling his name], was I Mangayoaberang.
|-
|
|-
|ma'gauka. ri Marusu'. nikana. Patanna Langkana.
|-
|[Meanwhile, the ruler] that ruled in Maros [on that time] was Patanna Langkana.
|-
|
|-
|areng matena. nikana. Tumamenang ri Bulu'duaya.
|-
|His posthumous name is Tumamenang ri Bulu'duaya.
|-
|
|-
|areng kalenna iang kumabassung. I Mappasomba.
|-
|His given name, may i not be damned, was I Mappasomba.
|-
|
|-
|areng pamana'na. nikana. I Daeng Nguraga.
|-
|His proper name was I Daeng Nguraga.
|-
|
|-
|Tuma'gauka. ri Bajeng. ana'na. Karaeng Loe. nikanaya Daenna I Pasairi. kakanna I Daeng Masarro.
|-
|He who ruled in Bajeng [Polombangkeng] is the son of Karaeng Loe, named Daenna I Pasairi, older sibbling of I Daeng Masarro.
|-
|
|-
|iaminne. sari'battang. Tuma'gauka. ri Sanrabone. ri Lengkese'. ri Katingang. ri Jamarang. ri Jipang. ri Mandalle'.
|-
|This [I Pasairi] were sibblings with those that ruled in Sanrabone, in Lengkese, in Katingang, in Jamarang, in Jipang, [and] in Mandalle.
|-
|
|-
|tujui sisari'battang. ma'la'lang sipue–ngaseng.
|-
|seven sibblings, all half-umbrella'd [=ruled].
|-
|
|-
|iaminne Karaeng. nilipungi. ri Gaukang Tallua.
|-
|This Karaeng [Tumapa'risi' Kallonna] is supported by The Three Gaukang.
|-
|
|-
|Karaenga ri Lakiung. angngagangi. Gurudaya. tu Mangngasaya. tu Tomboloka. tu Saomataya.
|-
|Kareng Lakiung accompanies Gurudaya, [along with] Mangngasa, Tombolo''' and Saomata people,
|-
|
|-
|anjorengi. kalenna. imamakasi. Baro'boso'. napammenténgi.|-
|there they set camp, in Baro'boso, on alert,
|-
|
|-
|iami naagaang. situju. tu Polombangkenga.|-
|they joined together [to] face Polombangkeng people.
|-
|
|-
|kalenna Karaenga. siagángi. Sulengkaya.|-
|The Karaeng [Tumapa'risi' Kallonna] himself accompanies Sulengkaya,
|-
|
|-
|Rappocini. napammenténgi. siagángi. tu Sudianga. tu Manujua. tu Borisalloa.|-
|ready in Rappocini along with Sudiang, Manuju, and Borisallo people.
|-
|
|-
|tu Talloka. siagaang. kalenna. I Daeng Masarro. iami naagaang. situju. kalenna Karaenga.|-
|Tallo people and I Daeng Masarro himself faced The Karaeng.
|-
|
|-
|Karaenga ri Data'. siagángi. Cakkuridia. Tamamangung. napammenténgi. siagángi. Paccellekang. Pattallassang. Bontomanai'.|-
|Karaeng Data accompanies Cakkuridia, in Tamamangung he readies themself along with Paccellekang, Pattallasang, and Bontomanai [people],
|-
|
|-
|tu Marusuka. naagaang. situju.|-
|Maros people, they faced.
|-
|
|-
|le'baki. ma'bunduki. nipalarimi. tu Talloka tu Marusuka. tu Polombangkenga.|-
|Once the battle started, the Tallo', Maros, and Polombangkeng people had already fled.
|-
|
|-
|tu Marusuka. larina. ri Tamamangung. tulusuki. manaung ri Marusu'.|-
|Maros people went from Tamamangung, directly to Maros.
|-
|
|-
|tu Polombangkenga. mangnguloro'–mami. biseang. na ma'biseang manai'.|-
|Polombangkeng people stretch out their oars and pedal up [back to Polombangkeng].
|-
|
|-
|tu Talloka. malari mantama ri Tallo
|-
|Tallo people ran back to Tallo' [region]
|-
|
|-
|nassulu' mae. nasuro kio'. Karaenga. Tumapa'risi Kallonna. antama ri Tallo'.|-
|[Then] they sent out a request to meet The Karaeng, Tumapa'risi' Kallonna. Thus he entered Tallo.
|-
|
|-
|tuju bangngi i. lalang. nitoana. nirappói.
|-
|Seven nights he was there, entertained and given betel nut. 
|-
|
|-
|iaminjo. nasitalli'mo. Karaenga. ri Gowa. Karaenga. ri Tallo'. gallaranga. ia– ngaseng. ri baruga nikelua.
|-
|These [mentioned below] thus sworn: The Karaeng Gowa, The Karaeng Tallo''', [along with] every gallarrang in balairung.
|-
|
|-
|ia–iannamo. tau. ampasiewai. Gowa. Tallo'. iamo nacalla. rewata.|-
|[That] anyone who makes Gowa and Tallo hostile to each other, will surely be cursed by the gods.
|}

Comparison to Lontara script 
In its development, the use of the Makasar script was gradually replaced by the Lontara Bugis script, which is sometimes referred to as "New Lontara" by Makassarese writers. These two closely related scripts have almost identical writing rules, although in appearance they look quite different. A comparison of the two characters can be seen as follows:

Unicode 

Makasar script has been added to the Unicode Standard in June 2018 on Version 11.0.

The Unicode block for the Makassar script is U+11EE0–U+11EFF and contains 25 characters:

Font 
A font for Makasar script based on the unicode block were first created under the name Jangang-jangang in early 2020. This font support the graphite SIL technology and double letters, both with angka (example:  mami) and by double diacritic (example:  mimi and  mumu).

Notes

References

Bibliography 
 
 </ref>

See also 
 Makassarese language
 Lontara script

External links

Digital books 
 A collection of documents in Makasar language and script between the 18th and 19th centuries AD, British Library collection no. Add MS 12351

Others 
 Unicode Proposal on Makasar Script
 Preliminary Unicode Proposal on Makasar Script
 Download Makasar script font on Aksara di Nusantara or here

Obsolete writing systems
Brahmic scripts
Indonesian scripts